North Chiang Mai University (NCU) is a private university in Chiang Mai, Chiang Mai Province, Thailand founded in 1999.

References

External links 
 

Private universities and colleges in Thailand
Education in Chiang Mai
Educational institutions established in 1999
1999 establishments in Thailand